Àlex Corretja defeated Carlos Moyá in the final, 3–6, 3–6, 7–5, 6–3, 7–5 to win the singles tennis title at the 1998 ATP Tour World Championships. With the win, he became the first player to win the title without previously winning a major. The final was a rematch of that year's French Open final, where Moyá prevailed.

Pete Sampras was the two-time defending champion, but was defeated in the semifinals by Corretja.

Seeds

Draw

Finals

Red group
Standings are determined by: 1. number of wins; 2. number of matches; 3. in two-players-ties, head-to-head records; 4. in three-players-ties, percentage of sets won, or of games won; 5. steering-committee decision.

White group
Standings are determined by: 1. number of wins; 2. number of matches; 3. in two-players-ties, head-to-head records; 4. in three-players-ties, percentage of sets won, or of games won; 5. steering-committee decision.

See also
ATP World Tour Finals appearances

External links
Finals Draw
Round robin Draw (Red Group)
Round robin Draw (White Group)

Singles
1998 in German tennis
Tennis tournaments in Germany
Sport in Hanover